This is a list of awards, recognitions, achievements and nominations received by Filipino singer-songwriter and actor James Reid during his career.

International

100 Asian Heartthrobs

!
|-
| 2018
| Himself
| style="text-align:center;"| 100 Asian Heartthrobs of 2018
| 
|

MTV Europe Music Awards
The MTV Europe Music Awards are an event presented by MTV Networks Europe which awards prizes to musicians and performers.

!
|-
!scope="row"|2015
| style="text-align:center;"| Reid Alert
| style="text-align:center;"| Best Southeast Asia Act
| 
| style="text-align:center;"| 
|-
!scope="row"|2017
| style="text-align:center;"| James Reid
| style="text-align:center;"| Best Southeast Asia Act
| 
| style="text-align:center;"|

Nickelodeon Kids' Choice Awards
The Nickelodeon Kids' Choice Awards is an annual awards show that airs on the Nickelodeon cable channel, that honors the year's biggest television, movie, and music acts, as voted by Nickelodeon viewers.

!
|-
!scope="row"|2016
| 
| style="text-align:center;"| Favorite Pinoy Personality
| 
| style="text-align:center;"|

SBS PopAsia Awards
The SBS PopAsia Awards is an annual awards ceremony presented by the Australian music show SBS PopAsia to honor the Asian music industry.

!
|-
!scope="row"|2015
| style="text-align:center;"| Reid Alert
| style="text-align:center;"| Best Solo Star
| 
| style="text-align:center;"|
|-
!scope="row"|2016
| style="text-align:center;"| JaDine
| style="text-align:center;"| Best Fandom(with Nadine Lustre)
| 
| style="text-align:center;"|

Local

Aliw Awards
The Aliw Awards is an annual awards ceremony established by the renowned Philippine journalist Alice H. Reyes, to recognize achievements in the live entertainment industry in the Philippines.

!
|-
!scope="row"|2015
| style="text-align:center;"| Reid Alert
| style="text-align:center;"| Best New Male Artist
| 
| style="text-align:center;"|

AnakTV Seal Awards
The Anak TV Seal Award is an accolade given to Philippine television programs and personalities that are child-sensitive and family-friendly.

!
|-
!scope="row"|2016
| 
| style="text-align:center;"| AnakTV Makabata Star Awardee 
| 
| style="text-align:center;"|

ASAP Pop Viewers' Choice Awards
The ASAP Pop Viewers' Choice Awards is an annual award show that airs on the ABS-CBN, which is held on a Sunday afternoon during ASAP. It honors the year's biggest television, movie, and music acts, as voted by Kapamilya fans.

!
|-
!scope="row"|2010
| style="text-align:center;"| Pinoy Big Brother: Teen Clash 2010
| style="text-align:center;"| Pop Tween Popsies(with Ann Li)
| 
| style="text-align:center;"|
|-
!scope="row"|2011
| style="text-align:center;"| Good Vibes
| style="text-align:center;"| Pop Tween Popsies (with Devon Seron)
| 
| style="text-align:center;"|
|-
!scope="row" rowspan="4"|2014
| style="text-align:center;"| Para-paraan(by Nadine Lustre)
| style="text-align:center;"| Pop Celebrity Cameo in a Music Video
| 
| style="text-align:center;" rowspan="4"|
|-
| style="text-align:center;" rowspan=2|Diary ng Panget
| style="text-align:center;"| Pop Loveteam(with Nadine Lustre)
| 
|-
| style="text-align:center;"| Pop Screen Kiss(with Nadine Lustre)
| 
|-
| 
| style="text-align:center;"| Pop Male Cutie
| 
|-
!scope="row" rowspan="2"|2015
| 
| style="text-align:center;"| Pop Teen Hearthrob
| 
| style="text-align:center;" rowspan="2"|
|-
| style="text-align:center;"| Para sa Hopeless Romantic
| style="text-align:center;"| Pop Teen Love Team(with Nadine Lustre)
| 
|-
!scope="row" rowspan="2"|2016
| style="text-align:center;"| Till I Met You
| style="text-align:center;"| Pop Loveteam(with Nadine Lustre)
| 
| style="text-align:center;" rowspan="2"|
|-
| style="text-align:center;"| JaDine
| style="text-align:center;"| Pop Fans Club(with Nadine Lustre)
|

Awit Awards
The Awit Awards are music awards in the Philippines given annually by the Philippine Association of the Record Industry (PARI) to recognize the outstanding achievements in the music industry.

!
|-
!scope="row"|2014
| style="text-align:center;"| Alam Niya Ba
| style="text-align:center;"| Best Performance by a New Male Recording Artist
| 
| style="text-align:center;"|
|-
!scope="row" rowspan="2"|2016
| style="text-align:center;"| Huwag Ka Nang Humirit
| style="text-align:center;"| Best Performance by a Male Recording Artist
| 
| style="text-align:center;" rowspan=2"|
|-
| style="text-align:center;"| Hanap-Hanap
| style="text-align:center;"| Best Collaboration(with Nadine Lustre)
|

COMGUILD Academe's Choice Awards
The COMGUILD Academe's Choice Awards aims to recognize the contribution of Filipino endorsers, entrepreneur shows, and hosts in the field of entrepreneurship, business, marketing and advertising. Students and members of the academe from various colleges and universities in the Philippines are the one who vote for the awardees.

!
|-
!scope="row"|2015
| 
| style="text-align:center;"| Most Loved Male Endorser 
| 
| style="text-align:center;"|

EdukCircle Awards
The EdukCircle Awards recognizes exemplary performances of personalities in news and entertainment whose professional works have made significant contributions to Philippine music, film and television.

!
|-
!scope="row"|2015
| style="text-align:center;"| Para sa Hopeless Romantic
| style="text-align:center;"| Most Popular Breakout Loveteam of the Year(with Nadine Lustre)
| 
| style="text-align:center;"|
|-
!scope="row" rowspan=5|2016
| style="text-align:center;"| On the Wings of Love
| style="text-align:center;"| Drama Actor of the Year 
| 
| style="text-align:center;" rowspan="5"|
|-
| style="text-align:center;"| Reid Alert
| style="text-align:center;"| Most Influential Male Music Artist of the Year
| 
|-
| 
| style="text-align:center;"| Most Influential Film Celebrities of the Year(with Nadine Lustre)
| 
|-
| 
| style="text-align:center;"| Most Influential Love Team of the Year(with Nadine Lustre)
| 
|-
| 
| style="text-align:center;"| Most Influential Celebrity Endorser of the Year
|

FAMAS Awards
The FAMAS Awards are the annual honors given by the Filipino Academy of Movie Arts and Sciences (FAMAS), an organization composed of prize-winning writers and movie columnists, for achievements in the Philippine cinema for a calendar year.

!
|-
!scope="row"|2014 
| 
| style="text-align:center;"| German Moreno Youth Achievement Award
| 
| style="text-align:center;"|
|-
!scope="row"|2016
| style="text-align:center;"| Para sa Hopeless Romantic
| style="text-align:center;"| Best Actor
| 
| style="text-align:center;"|
|-
!scope="row"|2019
| style="text-align:center;"| Never Not Love You
| style="text-align:center;"| Best Actor
| 
| style="text-align:center;"|

GMMSF Box-Office Entertainment Awards
The GMMSF Box-Office Entertainment Awards is an annual award ceremony that honors stars and performers simply for their popularity and commercial success in the Philippine entertainment industry, regardless of their excellence in their particular fields.

!
|-
!scope="row"|2015 
| style="text-align:center;"| Diary ng PangetTalk Back and You're Dead
| style="text-align:center;"| Most Popular Loveteam in Movies & TV(with Nadine Lustre)
| 
| style="text-align:center;"|
|-
!scope="row"|2016
| style="text-align:center;"| On the Wings of Love
| style="text-align:center;"| Prince of Philippine Television
| 
| style="text-align:center;"|

Golden Laurel Lycean's Choice Media Awards

!
|-
!scope="row"|2016 
| style="text-align:center;"| On the Wings of Love
| style="text-align:center;"| Most Popular Love Team(with Nadine Lustre)
| 
| style="text-align:center;"|

MOR Pinoy Music Awards

!
|-
!scope="row" rowspan="4"|2015 
| style="text-align:center;"| No Erase 
| style="text-align:center;"| Best Collaboration(with Nadine Lustre)
| 
| style="text-align:center;" rowspan="4"|
|-
| style="text-align:center;"| Bahala Na
| style="text-align:center;"| Song of the Year(with Nadine Lustre)
| 
|-
| style="text-align:center;"| Talk Back and You're Dead OST
| style="text-align:center;"| Album of the Year(with Various Artists)
| 
|-
| style="text-align:center;"| Huwag Ka Nang Humirit
| style="text-align:center;"| Male Artist of the Year
| 
|-
!scope="row" rowspan=3|2016
| style="text-align:center;"| Hanap-Hanap 
| style="text-align:center;"| Best Collaboration of the Year(with Nadine Lustre)
| 
| style="text-align:center;" rowspan="3"|
|-
| style="text-align:center;"| Musikaw
| style="text-align:center;"| Male Artist of the Year
| 
|-
| style="text-align:center;"| Reid Alert
| style="text-align:center;"| Album of the Year
|

MYX Music Awards
The Myx Music Awards is an accolade presented by the cable channel Myx to honor the biggest hitmakers in the Philippines.

PEP List Choice Awards

!
|-
!scope="row" rowspan="4"|2015
| style="text-align:center;"| Diary ng Panget
| style="text-align:center;"| Breakout Star of the Year
| 
| style="text-align:center;" rowspan="4"|
|-
| style="text-align:center;"| PEPtalk Guesting
| style="text-align:center;"| Best PEPtalk Episode(with Nadine Lustre)
| 
|-
| style="text-align:center;" rowspan=2|Diary ng PangetTalk Back and You're Dead
| style="text-align:center;"| Male Movie Star of the Year
| 
|-
| style="text-align:center;"| Celebrity Pair of the Year(with Nadine Lustre)
| 
|-
!scope="row" rowspan="3"|2016
| style="text-align:center;"| Para sa Hopeless Romantic
| style="text-align:center;"| Male Movie Star of the Year
| 
| style="text-align:center;" rowspan="3"|
|-
| style="text-align:center;" rowspan=2|On the Wings of Love
| style="text-align:center;"| Celebrity Pair of the Year(with Nadine Lustre)
| 
|-
| style="text-align:center;"| Male TV Star of the Year
| 
|-
!scope="row" rowspan=2|2017
| style="text-align:center;" rowspan=2|Till I Met You
| style="text-align:center;"| Celebrity Pair of the Year(with Nadine Lustre)
| 
| style="text-align:center;" rowspan="2"|
|-
| style="text-align:center;"| Newsmaker of the Year(with Nadine Lustre)
|

PMPC Star Awards for Movies
The PMPC Star Awards for Movies is an award giving body organized by the Philippine Movie Press Club that gives honor to the Filipino mainstream and independent films, personalities and movie industry stakeholders.

!
|-
!scope="row" rowspan="3"|2015
| style="text-align:center;"| Diary ng Panget 
| style="text-align:center;"| New Movie Actor of the Year
| 
| style="text-align:center;" rowspan="3"|
|-
| style="text-align:center;"| No Erase
| style="text-align:center;" rowspan=2|Movie Original Theme Song of the Year(with Nadine Lustre)
| 
|-
| style="text-align:center;"| Bahala Na
| 
|-
!scope="row"|2016
| style="text-align:center;"| Para sa Hopeless Romantic
| style="text-align:center;"| Movie Loveteam of the Year(with Nadine Lustre)
| 
| style="text-align:center;" |

PMPC Star Awards for Music
The PMPC Star Awards for Music is an award giving body organized by the Philippine Movie Press Club that gives honor to the Filipino mainstream and independent music, personalities and music industry stakeholders.

!
|-
!scope="row" rowspan="3"|2015
| style="text-align:center;" rowspan=3|Reid Alert
| style="text-align:center;"| Male Pop Artist of the Year
| 
| style="text-align:center;" rowspan="3"|
|-
| style="text-align:center;"| RnB Album of the Year
| 
|-
| style="text-align:center;"| RnB Artist of the Year
| 
|-
!scope="row" rowspan="2"|2016
| style="text-align:center;" rowspan=2|On the Wings of Love OST
| style="text-align:center;"| Male Pop Artist of the Year
| 
| style="text-align:center;" rowspan="2"|
|-
| style="text-align:center;"| Pop Album of the Year(with Nadine Lustre)
| 
|-

PMPC Star Awards for TV
The PMPC Star Awards for TV is annual award giving body recognizing the outstanding programming produced by the several TV networks in the Philippines every year.

!
|-
!scope="row" rowspan="2"|2016
| style="text-align:center;" rowspan=2|On the Wings of Love
| style="text-align:center;"| German Moreno Power Tandem of the Year
| 
| style="text-align:center;" rowspan="2"|
|-
| style="text-align:center;"| Best Drama Actor
| 
|-
!scope="row" |2017
| style="text-align:center;"| Till I Met You
| style="text-align:center;"| Best Drama Actor
| 
| 
|-

PUSH Awards

!
|-
!scope="row" rowspan="6"|2015
| 
| style="text-align:center;"| Push Like Category: Favorite Group or Tandem(with Nadine Lustre)
| 
| style="text-align:center;" rowspan="6"|
|-
| 
| style="text-align:center;"| Push Tweet Category: Most Loved Group or Tandem(with Nadine Lustre)
| 
|-
| 
| style="text-align:center;"| Push Gram Category: Most Popular Group or Tandem(with Nadine Lustre)
| 
|-
| 
| style="text-align:center;"| Push Play Category: Best Group or Tandem(with Nadine Lustre)
| 
|-
| 
| style="text-align:center;"| Push Play Category: Best Male Celebrity
| 
|-
| 
| style="text-align:center;"| Awesome OOTD King
| 
|-
!scope="row" rowspan="9"|2016
| 
| style="text-align:center;"| Push Like Male Celebrity
| 
| style="text-align:center;" rowspan="9"|
|-
| 
| style="text-align:center;"| Push Like Group/Tandem(with Nadine Lustre)
| 
|-
| 
| style="text-align:center;"| Push Gram Male Celebrity
| 
|-
| 
| style="text-align:center;"| Push Gram Group/Tandem(with Nadine Lustre)
| 
|-
| 
| style="text-align:center;"| Push Play Male Celebrity
| 
|-
| 
| style="text-align:center;"| Push Play Group/Tandem(with Nadine Lustre)
| 
|-
| 
| style="text-align:center;"| Popular Male Fashion Icon
| 
|-
| style="text-align:center;"| Marvin Gaye(originally sung by Charlie Puth ft. Meghan Trainor)
| style="text-align:center;"| Popular Song Cover(with Nadine Lustre)
| 
|-
| style="text-align:center;"| On the Wings of Love
| style="text-align:center;"| Popular TV Performance(with Nadine Lustre)
|

RAWR Awards

!
|-
!scope="row" rowspan="3"|2015
| style="text-align:center;"| On the Wings of Love
| style="text-align:center;"| Trending Love Team of the Year(with Nadine Lustre)
| 
| style="text-align:center;" rowspan="3"|
|-
| 
| style="text-align:center;"| Fashionable Celeb of the Year
| 
|-
| 
| style="text-align:center;"| Male Celebrity of the Year
| 
|-
!scope="row" rowspan="4"|2016
| style="text-align:center;"| Till I Met You
| style="text-align:center;"| Favorite Actor of the Year
| 
| style="text-align:center;" rowspan="3"|
|-
| style="text-align:center;"| JaDine(with Nadine Lustre)
| style="text-align:center;"| Fan Club of the Year
| 
|-
| style="text-align:center;"| Till I Met You(with Nadine Lustre)
| style="text-align:center;"| Popular Love Team of the Year
| 
|-
| 
| style="text-align:center;"| Ultimate Star of the Year
| 
| style="text-align:center;"|

Star Cinema Online Awards

!
|-
!scope="row" rowspan=4|2014
| 
| style="text-align:center;"| Newsmaker of the Year
| 
| style="text-align:center;" rowspan="4"|
|-
| style="text-align:center;" rowspan=2|Talk Back and You're Dead
| style="text-align:center;"| Favorite Loveteam(with Nadine Lustre)
| 
|-
| style="text-align:center;"| Favorite Male Movie Star
| 
|-
| style="text-align:center;"| Bahala Na
| style="text-align:center;"| Favorite Star Cinema Theme Song of the Year(with Nadine Lustre)
| 
|-
!scope="row" rowspan=4|2015
| style="text-align:center;"| Para sa Hopeless Romantic 
| style="text-align:center;"| Favorite Male Movie Star
| 
| style="text-align:center;"|
|-
| style="text-align:center;"| On the Wings of Love 
| style="text-align:center;"| Favorite TV Loveteam(with Nadine Lustre)
| 
| style="text-align:center;"|
|-
| 
| style="text-align:center;"| Favorite Newsmaker
| 
| style="text-align:center;"|
|-
| 
| style="text-align:center;"| Favorite Love Out Loveteam(with Nadine Lustre)
| 
| style="text-align:center;"|
|-
!scope="row" rowspan=5|2016
| style="text-align:center;"| Randomantic
| style="text-align:center;"| Favorite Recording Artist
| 
| style="text-align:center;"|
|-
| 
| style="text-align:center;"| Favorite Social Media Personality
| 
| style="text-align:center;"|
|-
| style="text-align:center;"| JaDine
| style="text-align:center;"| Best Fandom(with Nadine Lustre)
| 
| style="text-align:center;"|
|-
| style="text-align:center;" rowspan=2| Till I Met You
| style="text-align:center;"| Favorite Love Team(with Nadine Lustre)
| 
| style="text-align:center;"|
|-
| style="text-align:center;"| Favorite Male Star
| 
| style="text-align:center;"|
|-

Yes! Magazine

!
|-
!scope="row"|2015
| 
| style="text-align:center;"| 100 Most Beautiful Stars
| 
| style="text-align:center;"|
|-
!scope="row"|2016
| 
| style="text-align:center;"| 100 Most Beautiful Stars
| 
| style="text-align:center;"|
|-
!scope="row"|2017
| 
| style="text-align:center;"| 100 Most Beautiful Stars
| 
| style="text-align:center;"|

References

Lists of awards received by Australian actor
Lists of awards received by Australian musician
Lists of awards received by Filipino actor
Lists of awards received by Filipino musician